Robinsonville, also known as Robisonville, is a ghost town and former mining town in Grant County, Oregon, located near Greenhorn.

History
There is much debate over whether the correct name of the community is "Robinsonville" or "Robisonville"; it was named after William Robinson however post office records use Robisonville, and government records are conflicting. The post office was established on June 27, 1878 and closed on July 23, 1884; Charles W. Daggett served as postmaster.

References

Unincorporated communities in Grant County, Oregon
Unincorporated communities in Oregon
Ghost towns in Oregon
1878 establishments in Oregon
Populated places established in 1878
1884 disestablishments in Oregon